is a 1,590-seat multi-purpose hall located in Sendai, Japan. It opened in 1964 and has hosted artists such as Cheap Trick, Whitesnake and Mötley Crüe. After the sale of the naming rights, Tokyo Electron Hall Miyagi became, on April 1, 2008, the preferred nickname for Miyagi Prefectural Auditorium.

References

External links
 Official website 

Music venues in Japan